George Franklin Wallace (May 14, 1887 – February 25, 1964) was an American manufacturer and politician from New York.

Life
He was born on May 14, 1887, in Syracuse, New York, the son of tinsmith Emilus Franklin Wallace (1860–1920) and Mary (Schattle) Wallace (1858–1918). He attended the public schools. He manufactured glassware and mirrors. He married Rose M. Dershang (1885–1967).

Wallace was a member of the New York State Senate (38th D.) from 1941 to 1944, sitting in the 163rd and 164th New York State Legislatures.

He died on February 25, 1964, in Syracuse, New York; and was buried at the Oakwood Cemetery there.

Sources

External links

1887 births
1964 deaths
Businesspeople from Syracuse, New York
Republican Party New York (state) state senators
Burials at Oakwood Cemetery (Syracuse, New York)
20th-century American politicians
Politicians from Syracuse, New York
20th-century American businesspeople